Regner is either a German language habitational surname for someone from Regen or alternatively from a personal name composed of the ancient Germanic elements ragin "counsel" + hari, heri "army". Notable people with the name include:
 Alfred-Georges Regner (1902–1987), French surrealist painter and engraver
 Art Regner, American radio personality
 Åsa Regnér (born 1964), Swedish Social Democratic politician
 Brent Regner (born 1989), Canadian professional ice hockey defenceman
 David J. Regner (1931–2013), American politician
 Evelyn Regner (born 1966), Austrian lawyer and politician 
 Georg Regner (born 1953), Austrian sprinter
 Rudolf Regner (1917–1941), Polish scout, soldier and member of the White Couriers
 Shelley Regner (born 1988), American actress and singer
 Tobias Regner (born 1982), German singer and guitarist 
 Tom Regner (1944–2014), American football player

References 

German-language surnames
German toponymic surnames
Surnames from given names
Surnames of Austrian origin